Torquhil Ian Campbell, 13th and 6th Duke of Argyll (born 29 May 1968), styled as Earl of Campbell before 1973 and as Marquess of Lorne between 1973 and 2001, is a Scottish peer.

The family's main seat is Inveraray Castle, although the Duke and Duchess spend time at other residences, including one in London.

Biography
The Duke is the elder child and only son of Ian Campbell, 12th and 5th Duke of Argyll and Iona Mary Colquhoun, daughter of Sir Ivar Colquhoun, 8th Baronet. He was educated at Craigflower Preparatory School, Cargilfield Preparatory School, Glenalmond College, and the Royal Agricultural College, Cirencester. At the last of these, he trained as a chartered surveyor.

He served as a Page of Honour to Queen Elizabeth II from 1981 to 1983. He became a sales agent, salesman and company manager. Among his 29 titles are: Master of the Royal Household of Scotland, Admiral of the Western Coasts and Isles, and the Chief of Clan Campbell.

He is the captain of Scotland's national elephant polo team, which won the 2004 and 2005 World Elephant Polo Association World Championships. He represents Pernod Ricard distillers, promoting Scotch whiskies. He is a Freeman of the City of London and a Liveryman of the Worshipful Company of Distillers.

Marriage and children
On 8 June 2002 at St. Mary's Church, Fairford, Gloucestershire, the Duke married Eleanor Cadbury, a member of the Cadbury chocolate family.  She is the daughter of Peter Hugh George Cadbury (previously chairman of Close Brothers Corporate Finance) and his wife Sally Strouvelle.

The Duke and Duchess have three children:
 Archibald Friedrich Campbell, Marquess of Lorne (born London, 9 March 2004), known as Archie Lorne. He served as a Page of Honour to the Queen from 2015–2018.
 Lord Rory James Campbell (born London, 3 February 2006)
 Lady Charlotte Mary Campbell (born London, 29 October 2008).

The Duchess is a Patroness of the Royal Caledonian Ball and the president of The Georgian Group.

Arms

See also 
 Torquil, for background on the name Torquhil

References

External links 
 Debrett's People of Today
 Inveraray Castle
 CCSNA
 Torquhil Campbell, 13th Duke of Argyll

1968 births
Alumni of the Royal Agricultural University
British people of American descent
Torquhil
13
Living people
Pages of Honour
People educated at Cargilfield School
People educated at Craigflower Preparatory School
People educated at Glenalmond College
People from Argyll and Bute
Scottish landowners
Tennant family